Integral membrane protein 2B (ITM2B or BRI2) is a protein that in humans is encoded by the ITM2B gene.

ITM2B or BRI2 is a gene located on chromosome 13. The gene is connected to familial Danish dementia and familial British dementia causing amyloid and pre-filbrillar effects similar to those seen in Alzheimer's.

References

Further reading